The Lockheed WP-3D Orion is a highly modified P-3 Orion used by the Aircraft Operations Center division of the National Oceanic and Atmospheric Administration (NOAA). Only two of these aircraft exist, each incorporating numerous features for the role of collecting weather information. During hurricane season, the WP-3Ds are deployed for duty as hurricane hunters. The aircraft also support research on other topics, such as Arctic ice coverage, air chemistry studies, and ocean water temperature and current analysis.

Design
The WP-3Ds are equipped with three weather radars, C band radar in the nose and on the lower fuselage, and an X-band radar in the aircraft's tail. They are also equipped with the ability to deploy dropsondes into storm systems, and have onboard temperature sensors, and other meteorological equipment. While the aircraft are not specially strengthened for flying into hurricanes, their decks were reinforced to withstand the additional equipment load.

It has a barber-pole sampler (named for its red-and-white stripes) that protrude from the aircraft's front, a tail Doppler weather radar, and other unique-looking instruments hanging from the wing.

Operational history
NOAA currently operates two WP-3Ds nicknamed Miss Piggy and Kermit, and their logos feature the characters created by Jim Henson Productions. NOAA's other hurricane hunting aircraft, the Gulfstream IV-SP, is named Gonzo; they complement the fleet of WC-130 aircraft operated by the United States Air Force 53rd Weather Reconnaissance Squadron. As of 2014, the two Orions had each flown more than 10,000 hours and flown into more than 80 hurricanes.

Between 2015 and 2017, the aircraft received major overhauls, costing a total of $35 million. This work was performed by the United States Navy's Fleet Readiness Center Southeast in Jacksonville Florida. The work included new wings and engines and upgraded radars and avionics. NOAA anticipates that these changes will allow the aircraft to fly until between 2032 and 2037.

Specifications (WP-3D Orion)

See also

Notes

External links

 AOC description of the WP-3D
 Military Officer magazine article on the WP-3D

1970s United States special-purpose aircraft
P-003, W
Four-engined tractor aircraft
Low-wing aircraft
Four-engined turboprop aircraft
National Oceanic and Atmospheric Administration
WP-3